Westonaria Local Municipality was a local municipality in West Rand District Municipality, Gauteng, South Africa. After municipal elections on 3 August 2016 it was merged with the Randfontein Local Municipality into the larger Rand West City Local Municipality.

Background
The mining industry represents the largest employment sector in the municipality. The unemployment rate is approximately 30%.  In 2007, 34% of households had access to piped water inside their homes, an improvement of 14 percentage points since 2001.  Electricity is used for lighting, cooking, and heating in about 65% of households.

Main places
The 2001 census divided the municipality into the following main places:

Politics 
The municipal council consists of thirty-one members elected by mixed-member proportional representation. Sixteen councillors are elected by first-past-the-post voting in sixteen wards, while the remaining fifteen are chosen from party lists so that the total number of party representatives is proportional to the number of votes received. In the election of 18 May 2011 the African National Congress (ANC) won a majority of twenty-three seats on the council.
The following table shows the results of the election.

References

External links
 Official website

Former local municipalities of South Africa
Rand West City Local Municipality